Matt Wallace is an American record producer.

Matt Wallace may also refer to:

Matt Wallace (racing driver), American race car driver

Matt Wallace (golfer), English golfer